Don't Kill the Magic is the debut studio album by Canadian reggae fusion band Magic!. It was released on June 30, 2014 through Latium Entertainment and RCA Records. The production on the album was primarily handled by Adam Messinger along with the other members of the band. The album was preceded by the single "Rude" which peaked at number six in Canada and became a chart-topper in the United States and the United Kingdom and top ten hit in Australia, New Zealand, Denmark, the Netherlands and Sweden.

Don't Kill the Magic also spawned three other singles: "Don't Kill the Magic", "Let Your Hair Down" and "No Way No". The album received generally positive reviews from music critics and was a moderate commercial success. It debuted at number six on the US Billboard 200 chart, selling 36,000 copies in its first week.

Singles 
Don't Kill the Magic was spawned by four singles from its songs.  The lead single,  "Rude" was originally released as promotional single on October 11, 2013. It was eventually re-released as the lead single from the album on February 24, 2014. The single peaked at number one on the US Billboard Hot 100, becoming MAGIC!'s most successful single in the US to date.

"Don't Kill the Magic" was released as the second (international) single from the album.

"Let Your Hair Down"  was released as the third (second, in the US) single from the album.

"No Way No" was released as the fourth (third, in the US) single from the album.

Commercial performance
Don't Kill the Magic debuted at number six on the US Billboard 200 chart, selling 36,000 copies in its first week. This became the group's first US top-ten debut on the chart. As of July 2016, the album has sold 156,000 copies in the United States.

In their home country of Canada, the album debuted at number five on the Canadian Albums Chart.

Track listing 
Credits adapted from album liner notes.
 signifies a co-producer

Charts

Weekly charts

Year-end charts

Certifications

Release history

References

2014 debut albums
Magic! albums
RCA Records albums
Reggae fusion albums